Ümit Birol (born 26 January 1963) is a retired Turkish football midfielder and later manager. He was capped once for Turkey, and was also a squad member at the 1987 Mediterranean Games.

References

1963 births
Living people
Turkish footballers
Samsunspor footballers
Adanaspor footballers
Antalyaspor footballers
Adana Demirspor footballers
Altay S.K. footballers
Fenerbahçe S.K. footballers
Kocaelispor footballers
Dardanelspor footballers
Eskişehirspor footballers
Yıldırım Bosna S.K. footballers
Turkey international footballers
Turkish football managers
Altay S.K. managers
Alibeyköy S.K. managers
Competitors at the 1987 Mediterranean Games
Mediterranean Games bronze medalists for Turkey
Mediterranean Games medalists in football
Association football midfielders